The 2006 Campionato Italiano Superturismo Season was the second season of the Italian Superturismo Championship since its recreation in 2005 (at the same time as the ETCC, the promoted Italian championship, was turned into the WTCC). It had several well-known contenders, such as Alessandro Zanardi, Emanuele Naspetti and retired ski-racer Kristian Ghedina.
Overall a total of seven race weekends of two races each were held at six different circuits. The championship was won by Roberto Colcigao driving for SEAT.

Teams and drivers

Race calendar and results

Championship standings
Scoring system

Drivers' Championship

Constructors' Championship

Superturismo Championship
Italian Superturismo Championship